Martin J. Levitt (14 October 1944 – 21 November 2004) was a supervisory trainer, union buster and a union organizer on and off over a 20-year period before 1987 when he reportedly changed direction.  He went from anti union to anti management and founded Justice for Labor Foundation and later wrote about  his career in his autobiography released in 1993 entitled Confessions of a Union Buster which he authored with Terry Conrow Toczynski. The book found success among labor unions due to the lurid details he outlined about union busting tactics he claims to have used. Levitt says he entered the field in 1969 "as a young man with no particular feelings about unions but with a desire to use his considerable wits and smooth tongue to get ahead."  Levitt claims to have been "one of the multimillion-dollar industry's best talents...caught up in the money and intellectual pleasure of the pursuit." During his so-called reformed career he was known for holding seminars, newspaper articles and some national television interviews such as 60 minutes and the TODAY show.

In the book Levitt details his work history from an inexperienced consultant first hired by a former IBEW union organizer named John Sheridan who had earned his stripes as a disciple of Nathan Shefferman who wrote a guide to union busting. Levitt recalled during his interview that Sheridan's 2nd in command Nick Sangalis did a background check and found "one" criminal skeleton in his closet: a conviction for receiving stolen property which, as detailed in his book, would become one of a long list of criminal convictions along with chronic alcoholism and mental illness for which the latter was diagnosed in 1977. Levitt's book details his addictions to money and alcohol and parallels he drew to his serial criminal history including forgeries, check fraud, insurance fraud, arson, abusive outbursts, rehab centers and prison with what he ofttimes claimed to be what caused his illegal union busting activities at some 200 organizations.  His consulting career was atypical and went through upheavels until it culminated in what he terms was his "awakening" in 1987 when out of desperation he called the AFL-CIO offices in Washington DC  and spoke to the publisher of the RUB sheet (Report on Union Busters) saying "they had one less union buster to worry about". and soon thereafter he became a self-proclaimed authority on union busting.  His critics believe he was a clever opportunist who found one more way to exploit labor unions as an end to his means.

Changing Sides

"My awakening came in late 1987.  I was making $200,000 a year and living on a five-acre wooded estate in an exclusive community.  I traveled, dined and lodged first class, and drove only the finest luxury cars.  By then I had directed more than 200 anti-union campaigns--and lost only five--and had trained craven managers to go and do likewise at their own companies.  I was at the top of my field, one of the best and one of the richest.  No, I was not driven from the field by need. I was driven by horror and remorse".

The last chapter of Levitt's book contradicts that "need" didn't drive him to leave union busting.  In 1987, the year of his awakening, Levitt was unemployed, back in rehab, had been indicted for felony insurance fraud and car theft, had lost his house to debt, and in need of a relative to pay off the $150,000 balance of his mortgage,  and most importantly, in need of a way to earn a living.  Contrary to his reported feelings of "horror and remorse", his "need" did not lead him to redemption but to yet another union busting job even AFTER he famously called the AFL-CIO to repent his "dirty deeds".  In 1988 he busted the  Teamsters at Structural Composite Industries (SCI) in Pomona CA and claims to have earned $40,000. After busting the Teamsters, he went to San Diego to address the Brotherhood of Carpenters as a reformed union buster.

Detractors

David Sickler, the AFL CIO Western Regional Director said, "He strikes me as a cheesy hustler.  He made a living fighting us and now he wants to make a living showing us how bad he was to us. He's never been big on morality."

Levitt's detractors have viewed him as an opportunist.  Some say his claims were untrue Levitt described himself as a golden tongued con artist: "When Nick Sangalis, Sheridan's second in command ratified my hiring, he commented 'the kid from Cleveland was the best damned bullshit artist I've ever met'".

The Culinary Union blocked the AFL-CIO's efforts to have Martin Levitt write a "bust the union busters" brochure and a training film for organizers due to their mistrust from an experience with him years previous as an organizer in 1975. It started with his firing from 3M (Modern Management Methods) for failure to pay back a corporate loan of $5000. Simultaneously with that firing he took a job with World Airways as a supervisory trainer but was fired after a few months for conduct unbecoming which made him seek work. He began "counter organizing" on his own at Rusty Scupper where he met Chuck Irvine, the president and chief organizer of Hotel Employees and Restaurant Employees Union and Bartenders International Union Local 28 who asked him to join them as an organizer. As he'd done in the past with other employers, he managed to get a $5000 loan (from the union) but was soon outed as a double agent and found himself unemployable by both sides, in bankruptcy again and seeking work.

Barbara Noble, a New York Times writer, asked in her article if Levitt was just a bad apple or was he representative of people in his field.  She said,  "He seems to take a compromise view that his more unfortunate personal proclivitiesgreased by scotch and vodkaallowed him to avoid his conscience".  In one breath he claims his book is an act of contrition for victims of his union campaigns but makes no visible apology to the victime of his forgeries and fraudulent check scams. which got him in far more trouble than any dirty trick he ever played on a union.

Jack Sheridan, Levitt's first labor employer said, “Over the years I've trained about 155 people. There were maybe two I wish I'd never met.  One was Levitt. I think of the movie 'Elmer Gantry,' where the guy is screwing everybody yet still convinced them he believed in God.  I don't think Marty knows what the hell the truth is."

Chasing Money

"Borrowing money and never paying it back became an unfortunate pattern which caused me to lose friends, burn business contacts, and spoil family relations.  I have chased money endlessly.  The combination of money and alcohol would come to throw me into bankruptcy, poison my marriage, and land me in prison." He add that "he quit consulting firms in 1975 and then for 8 years (through 1983) ran a series of one man union busting enterprises called Employee Synthesis Programs and Human Resources Institute and struck it rich."

The veracity of "striking it rich" and "running one man enterprises" was contradicted in his own words within his book which detailed a series of convictions for grand theft and jail time as well as dismissals from employers throughout that time. In 1975 he was dismissed from 3M (Modern Management Methods) as a consultant, also from World Airways as a supervisory trainer, and later from Hotel Employees and Restaurant Employees Union as a union organizer. In 1977 he formed a company called Employee Unity Institute and ran day-long seminars. Shortly after he teamed up with a company called "Systems for Human Resources" which in 1978 voted him off their board and dismissed him for starting a business using their name and redirecting their invoices to his benefit. They filed a series of complaints in Superior Court of the State of California, County of Marin for Levitt to cease desist. In his book he refers to that relationship as merely ending with no further details.

"I couldn't believe how much money I was making (1982)". By 1983 I was making $15,000 a month and I was richer than most people ever dreamed of.  I was at the apex of my career.  I was on TOP!"

Maybe he should have said "I couldn't believe how much I was spending"!  From about 1979 to 1981, a series of legal actions were filed by The State of California  County of Marin for "Grand Theft" which contradicts "struck it rich" thesis. And in 1983 while claiming in one breath to be earning $15,000 a month, in another he described it as an alcoholic blur requiring him to enter rehab once again.

Levitt claimed in 1987 he had been making $200,000 a year and during speeches he's quoted as making $1000 per day  At a speech before organizers of the United Food and Commercial Workers Union, Local 1442, who were trying to organize the Marriott Marquis Hotel in Times Square Levitt said, "I hope you'll accept the fact that I'm sincere and I'm here to help you".  He reported again that he had made "$1000 per day plus expenses as a union buster".

Contradicting his claims again, the US District Court Northern District of Ohio filed against Martin J. Levitt for unpaid taxes showing income in 1983 of $64,009.26; in 1984 of $52,791.48; and in 1985 of $59,917.54 representing a stark contrast to his claims of $15,000 per month,  $200,000- $250,000 per year.

Levitt's resume is, in fact, unusual by any standards. It demonstrates he stood alone among his colleagues and could only hold a job for short periods before dismissals.  He worked singularly in his own enterprises much of his career.  Levitt admits no one has followed in his footsteps and dismissed the idea he exploited workers with his speeches and seminars and bemoaned "he was making "a third" of the "$250,000" income he previously claimed. Levitt lived "on top" no matter what his income and got himself multiple convictions for grand theft which put him either in jail or on supervised probation several times. Levitt has alleged that some companies were so eager to keep out unions that he was paid many times over what it would have cost to improve wages or working conditions. "They were obsessed," he said.

Summary

Martin J. Levitt wrote an "autobiography" about his journey for forgiveness at every union hall for his past as a union buster.  He tried in his book to ascribe all his dirty deeds to everyone who represented management.  Many union members ignored Levitt's serial amoral proclivities and hoisted him as the high priest of virtue. A safe statement would be that a labor attorneys and consultants are no more like Martin Levitt than a union organizer is like Jimmy Hoffa or Jackie Presser.

However, in 1993 the same year Confessions of a Union Buster was released, and 6 years after Martin J Levitt called the AFL-CIO professed his change, his cycle of deceptive psycho pathology had not.  The Superior Court of the State of California County of Contra Costa filed against Martin Jay Levitt for violation of Penal Code Section 529 False Personation and Penal Code 532 (a) for obtaining credit by false pretenses for taking over $25,000.

References 

1944 births
2004 deaths